O Homem do Pau-Brasil (English: The Brazilwood Man) is a 1981 Brazilian film directed by Joaquim Pedro de Andrade. The film is a fictional recreation of episodes of Oswald de Andrade's life and work.

Cast 
Ítala Nandi...Oswald de Andrade 1
Flávio Galvão...Oswald de Andrade 2
Regina Duarte...Lalá
Cristina Aché...Dorotéa
Paulo Hesse...Mário de Andrade
Carlos Gregório...Menotti Del Pichia
Juliana Carneiro da Cunha...foreign dancer (allusion to Isadora Duncan)
Dina Sfat...Branca Clara (allusion to Tarsila do Amaral)
Dora Pellegrino...Rosa Lituana (allusion to Pagu)
Grande Otelo... Tourvalu de Blesi, African prince
Etty Fraser...Dona Azeitona

Reception 
The critic of Folha de São Paulo wrote: "The reconstitution of the time is stylized, unnatural, and the tone of the staging is ridiculous." and continues "the whole cast is brilliant, and the highlight is Dina Sfat (...) Seen today, when we get used to a low and fearful cinema, O Homem do Pau-Brasil seems like an absurd object."

Awards 
1981: Festival de Brasília
Best Film (won)
Best Supporting Actress (Dina Sfat) (won)

References

External links 
 

1981 films
1980s Portuguese-language films
Brazilian comedy films
Films directed by Joaquim Pedro de Andrade